Mount Sharon is an historic estate house and plantation remnant in rural Orange County, Virginia. It was designed in 1937 by Louis Bancel LaFarge for Mr. and Mrs. Ellsworth Augustus, on a plantation they purchased in 1935 from the Taliaferro family, which had owned it since the early 18th century. The Augustuses demolished the deteriorating Victorian-era plantation house on the site to build the house, which has restrained exterior styling, and high quality interior woodwork designed by LaFarge.

See also
National Register of Historic Places listings in Orange County, Virginia

References

National Register of Historic Places in Orange County, Virginia
Houses completed in 1937
Houses on the National Register of Historic Places in Virginia
Georgian Revival architecture in Virginia
Houses in Orange County, Virginia